AR Scorpii (AR Sco) is a binary pulsar that consists of a white dwarf and a red dwarf. It is located close to the ecliptic plane in the constellation Scorpius. Parallax measurements made by Gaia put the system at a distance of about 380 light-years (120 parsecs).

AR Scorpii is the first "white dwarf-pulsar" to be discovered. Its unusual nature was first noticed by amateur astronomers. The 3.56-hour period in AR Scorpii's light curve caused it to be misclassified as a Delta Scuti variable, but in 2016, this period was found to be the binary orbital period. In addition, the system shows very strong optical, ultraviolet, and radio pulsations originating from the red dwarf with a period of just 1.97 minutes, which is a beat period from the orbital rotation and the white dwarf spin. These pulsations occur when a relativistic beam from the white dwarf sweeps across the red dwarf, which then reprocesses the beam into the observed electromagnetic energy. Although the white dwarf shows evidence of accretion in the past, at present it is not accreting significantly, and the system is powered by the spin-down of the white dwarf. The white dwarf's rotation will slow down on a timescale of  years. It has a radius of about  km, about the same size as Earth.

See also 

 AE Aquarii-Another white dwarf pulsar with weaker evidence.

References

M-type main-sequence stars
White dwarfs
Pulsars
Binary stars
Scorpius (constellation)
J16214728-2253102
Scorpii, AR